Angelo Frisa (1904 – 1968) was an Italian architect. His work was part of the architecture event in the art competition at the 1936 Summer Olympics.

References

1904 births
1968 deaths
20th-century Italian architects
Olympic competitors in art competitions
Place of birth missing